The Wilson River, part of the Lake Eyre Basin, is an ephemeral river located in the Channel Country in western Queensland, Australia.

The Wilson River rises on the slopes of the Grey Range and flows generally northwest through the Nockanoora (or Noccundra) waterhole and is joined by two minor tributaries before reaching its confluence with the Cooper Creek at what was known as Depot Camp (Camp 63). The river descends  over its  course.

It is believed that Burke and Wills first found water on the Macleay Plains and crossed Cooper Creek near its junction with the Wilson River, on 11 November 1860.

See also

List of rivers of Queensland

References

Rivers of Queensland
Lake Eyre basin